The New Hampshire Wildcats women’s ice hockey team represents the University of New Hampshire. The Wildcats participated in the NCAA tournament for the second consecutive season.

Regular season
Jennifer Wakefield led New Hampshire in scoring. In addition, Wakefield led the Wildcats with 13 power play goals, four shorthanded goals and nine game-winning goals.

Player stats

Awards and honors
Jennifer Wakefield, Top-10 finalist for the Patty Kazmaier Memorial Award
Jennifer Wakefield, Hockey East Player of the Month in December 2008
Jennifer Wakefield,  Hockey East Player of the Month in April 2009

Postseason
New Hampshire lost in the NCAA quarterfinals to Minnesota-Duluth.

References

External links
Official site

New Hampshire Wildcats women's ice hockey seasons
New Hampshire
New Ham
New Ham